The 2018 Kyrgyzstan League was the 27th season of the Kyrgyzstan League, Kyrgyzstan's top division of association football organized by the Football Federation of Kyrgyz Republic. The season started on 7 April 2018, with eight teams participating.

Teams

Note: Table lists in alphabetical order.

League table

Results

First round

Second round

Top scorers

Notes

References

External links

Kyrgyzstan League seasons
1
Kyrgyzstan